Jens Bergenström (born November 11, 1980) is a Swedish former professional ice hockey winger who last played for Leksands IF of the Swedish Hockey League (SHL).

Playing career
Bergenström played with the legendary club Leksands IF since 2004, including 3 Elitserien games in 2003–04 and 49 games in 2005–06. He also had tenures with Mörrums GoIS IK of the HockeyAllsvenskan and SaiPa of the Finnish Liiga.

On April 8, 2013, Bergenström extended his stay in the SHL with Leksands in agreeing to a two-year contract extension. On January 15, 2016, Bergenström announced his retirement from the SHL.

He made an informal return from his retirement, featuring in the lower Divisions each year with Ludvika HF and Smedjebacken HC through 2019.

Career statistics

References

External links

1980 births
Living people
Borlänge HF players
Leksands IF players
SaiPa players
Swedish ice hockey forwards
People from Borlänge Municipality
Sportspeople from Dalarna County